Cyana obliquilineata is a moth of the family Erebidae. It was described by George Hampson in 1900. It is found in Sikkim, India.

References

Cyana
Moths described in 1900